The Comet Nucleus Tour (CONTOUR) was a NASA Discovery-class space probe that failed shortly after its July 2002 launch. It had as its primary objective close flybys of two comet nuclei with the possibility of a flyby of a third known comet or an as-yet-undiscovered comet.

The two comets scheduled to be visited were Encke and Schwassmann-Wachmann-3, and the third target was d'Arrest. It was hoped that a new comet would have been discovered in the inner Solar System between 2006 and 2008, in which case the spacecraft trajectory would have been changed if possible to rendezvous with the new comet.

After the solid rocket motor intended to inject the spacecraft into solar orbit was ignited on August 15, 2002, contact with the probe could not be re-established. Ground-based telescopes later found three objects along the course of the satellite, leading to the speculation that it had disintegrated. Attempts to contact the probe were ended on December 20, 2002. The probe thus accomplished none of its primary scientific objectives, but did prove some spaceflight technologies, such as the APL-developed non-coherent Doppler tracking spacecraft navigation technique, which was later used on the New Horizons spacecraft.

Spacecraft

Design and construction
The CONTOUR spacecraft was constructed in-house at the Johns Hopkins University Applied Physics Laboratory. The spacecraft was fitted with a  whipple shield, similar to the one used on Stardust, on its leading face, designed with four layers of nextel fabric and seven layers of kevlar. The shield was built to allow the spacecraft to withstand the respective 28.2 and 14 km/s velocity flybys of comets Encke and Schwassmann-Wachmann-3, where the spacecraft would be subjected to numerous particles ejecting from the nuclei of the comets. Although mission scientists predicted that the spacecraft would take no significant damage during the Encke and Schwassmann-Wachmann-3 encounters, the shield and its prototypes were tested vigorously during the construction of the spacecraft, including one where a shield prototype was shot at with surrogate nylon particles. The results of the earlier tests allowed mission planners to determine a safe distance from which the CONTOUR would pass by comets targeted on the mission. Three of the four scientific instruments aboard the spacecraft were embedded within this shield.

Spacecraft subsystems

Power
Power for CONTOUR derives from solar cells, which are mounted onto the spacecraft, decorating the sides and rear and generating up to 670 watts of power. A nickel–cadmium battery designed to last up to nine ampere hours was also installed aboard the spacecraft in the event that the solar cell system fails, or does not provide enough power for the spacecraft or its instruments to function.

Communications and data

Propulsion and guidance

Scientific payload
 CIDA
The Comet Impact Dust Analyzer (CIDA)

 CRISP
The CONTOUR Remote Imager/Spectrograph (CRISP)

 CAI
The CONTOUR Aft Imager (CAI), also known as the CONTOUR Forward Imager (CFI)

 NGIMS
Neutral Gas Ion Mass Spectrometer (NGIMS)

Mission

CONTOUR launched on a Delta 7425 (a Delta II Lite launch vehicle with four strap-on solid-rocket boosters and a Star 27 third stage) on July 3, 2002, at 6:47:41 UT (2:47:41 a.m. EDT) from Cape Canaveral Air Force Station. It was launched into a high-apogee Earth orbit with a period of 5.5 days. Following a series of phasing orbits, the Star 30 solid rocket motor was used to perform an injection maneuver on August 15, 2002, to put CONTOUR in the proper trajectory for an Earth flyby on August 15, 2003, followed by an encounter with comet Encke on November 12, 2003, at a distance of 100 to 160 km and a flyby speed of 28.2 km/s, 1.07 AU from the Sun and 0.27 AU from Earth. During the August 2002 injection maneuver, the probe was lost.

Three more Earth flybys would have followed, on August 14, 2004, February 10, 2005, and February 10, 2006. On June 18, 2006, CONTOUR would have encountered comet Schwassmann-Wachmann-3 at 14 km/s, 0.95 AU from the Sun and 0.33 AU from Earth. Two more Earth flybys were scheduled in February 2007 and 2008, and a flyby of comet d'Arrest might have occurred on 16 August 2008 at a relative velocity of 11.8 km/s, 1.35 AU from the Sun and 0.36 AU from Earth. All flybys would have had a closest encounter distance of about 100 km and would have occurred near the period of maximum activity for each comet. After the comet Encke encounter, CONTOUR might have been retargeted towards a new comet if one was discovered with the desired characteristics (e.g. active, brighter than absolute magnitude 10, perihelion within 1.5 AU).

Investigation into failure
According to NASA: "An investigation board concluded that the most likely cause of the mishap was structural failure of the spacecraft due to plume heating during the solid-rocket motor burn. Alternate possible but less likely causes determined were catastrophic failure of the solid rocket motor, collision with space debris, and loss of dynamic control of the spacecraft."

Proposed reflight
After the loss of CONTOUR, a replacement spacecraft – CONTOUR 2 – was proposed, scheduled for launch in 2006. However, the replacement did not ultimately materialize.

See also

 List of missions to comets

References

External links
 
 CONTOUR Mission Profile by NASA's Solar System Exploration
 

 

Missions to comets
NASA space probes
Discovery Program
Satellite launch failures
Space probes launched in 2002
Derelict satellites in heliocentric orbit
Spacecraft launched by Delta II rockets
Destroyed space probes
Spacecraft launched in 2002
Space accidents and incidents in the United States